Edward Morton (1858–1922) was a British 19th-century author. His works included the musical comedy San Toy. The only child of Edward Morton and his wife Rosamund was J. B. Morton, who became a noted columnist and humourist.

References

1870 births
1922 deaths
British dramatists and playwrights
British male dramatists and playwrights